Path Transit is an Australian bus company operating Transperth services under contract to the Public Transport Authority. It is a subsidiary of Keolis Downer.

History
On 29 September 1996, Path Transit commenced operating services in the Marmion and Wanneroo areas from depots in Joondalup and Karrinyup with 191 Mercedes-Benz and Renault buses.

In January 1998, Path Transit gained further services in the Joondalup North area followed on 5 July 1998 by services in the Morley area. In 1998, a new depot was opened in Wangara. In May 2011, Path Transit lost the Joondalup contract area to Transdev WA and lost the Marmion area to Swan Transit, but retained operation of the Morley contract area. However, in October the following year, Path Transit took over the Kalamunda contract from Swan Transit.

As of November 2020, Path Transit continues to operate the Kalamunda and Morley area contracts. It also operates the Geraldton regional contract.

Depots
Path Transit operates six depots in total at Bayswater, Walliston, Malaga, Redcliffe, Welshpool, and Geraldton.

References

External links
Company website
Transperth

Bus companies of Western Australia
Keolis
Public transport in Perth, Western Australia
1996 establishments in Australia